The Civil Aviation Safety Authority (CASA PNG) is the civil aviation authority of Papua New Guinea. Its head office is in Six Mile, National Capital District, with a Boroko P.O. Box.

See also

 Papua New Guinea Accident Investigation Commission

References

External links
 Civil Aviation Safety Authority

Government of Papua New Guinea
Papua New Guinea
Civil aviation in Papua New Guinea
Transport organisations based in Papua New Guinea